Harry L. Ott Jr. (born October 2, 1952) is an American politician. A member of the Democratic Party, Ott was a member of the South Carolina House of Representatives, representing the 93rd District. He represented the district from 1998 through June 30, 2013. He served as the Minority Leader. Ott resigned to serve in the Farm Service Agency.

External links
South Carolina Legislature – Minority Leader Harry L. Ott, Jr. official SC Legislature website
 
Follow the Money – Harry L. Ott, Jr.
2006 2004 2002 2000 1998 1996 campaign contributions

1952 births
Living people
Members of the South Carolina House of Representatives